Cyperus canus is a species of sedge that is native to parts of Mexico, Central America and northern South America.

The species was first formally described by the botanists Carl Borivoj Presl and Jan Svatopluk Presl in 1828.

See also 
 List of Cyperus species

References 

canus
Plants described in 1828
Flora of Mexico
Flora of Colombia
Flora of Guatemala
Flora of Costa Rica
Flora of Honduras
Flora of Nicaragua
Taxa named by Jan Svatopluk Presl
Taxa named by Carl Borivoj Presl